Countess Alexandra Constantinovna von Zarnekau (– 28 May 1957) was the eldest daughter of Duke Constantine Petrovich of Oldenburg and his Georgian wife, Princess Agrippina Japaridze, Countess von Zarnekau, formerly married to the Georgian Prince Dadiani.

At age 16, on 16 February 1900, Countess Alexandra married Prince George Alexandrovich Yuryevsky, the son of Tsar Alexander II by his mistress (and later wife), Ekaterina Mikhailovna Dolgorukova, the Princess Yourievskya. They were married at Nice, France, and had one child, Prince Alexander Georgievich Yourievsky, who was born 21 December 1900. Alexandra and George divorced in 1908.

Countess Alexandra married secondly to Lev Vassilievich Naryshkin on 17 October 1908 at Paris, France. During World War I, Countess Alexandra worked as an administrator of the Russian hospital at Saloniki. After the war, she moved in Paris, France, where she died on 28 May 1957.

References

Bibliography
Debrett's Peerage, Baronetage, Knightage and Companionage, Kelly's Directories 1963, p. 19
Arnold McNaughton, The Book of Kings: A Royal Genealogy, Vol. 1, Garnstone Press 1973, pp. 216, 311
Hugh Montgomery-Massingberd, Burke's Royal Families of the World, Vol. 1, Burke's Peerage 1977
"Aleksandra Konstantinovna von Zarnekau, Countess von Zarnekau" at The Peerage
Edvard Radzinsky and Antonina Bouis, Alexander II: The Last Great Tsar, Simon & Schuster 2006
Alexandre Tarsaidze, Katia: Wife Before God, Macmillan 1970, p. 287
John Van Der Kiste, The Romanovs, 1818 - 1959: Alexander II of Russia and His Family, Sutton Publications 1998, p. 215 [illus. Family Tree]

1883 births
1957 deaths
White Russian emigrants to France
Countesses of the Russian Empire
Russian women of World War I
Russian people of Georgian descent
Emigrants from the Russian Empire to France